The double subdigital-pads skink (Scincella rara) is a species of skink, only known to live in Central Truong Son, Vietnam. It is a small skink with arboreal mode of life.

References

Scincella
Reptiles of Vietnam
Endemic fauna of Vietnam
Reptiles described in 1997
Taxa named by Ilya Darevsky
Taxa named by Nikolai Loutseranovitch Orlov